Sri Sunama Jakini Maatha was born in Suryavamshi Kshatriya Are-Katika community of Pinnepalli village in Anantapur district, Andhra Pradesh, India. A temple was built for this goddess in Gooty town of Anantapur district, Andhra Pradesh is also one of the first temple for Suryavamshi Kshatriya Are-katika community.

History 
Sri Sunama Jakini matha was born in Malkari gotram from the Are-Katika community at Pinnepalli village of Yadiki mandal, Tadipatri taluk, Anantapur district (officially: Anantapuramu), Andhra Pradesh state of India. She married Hanumanthakari Thanji Rao at a very young age. She was very devotional and use to observe fasting very often. One day during fasting she fell unconscious. Her husband thought that she was dead and ordered to bury her. Locals requested her husband to pass on the message to her mother, father and brothers who live in Pinnepalli village. Her husband did not allow this. As the locals were getting ready to bury her, they found that Sunama maatha was still alive and informed the same to her husband. Under the influence of alcohol her husband ordered them to bury her anyways. In that sense Sunama Jakini maatha took Jeeva Samadhi (Buddhism: Nirvana). It is estimated that this incident took place around 1803 AD.

Sunama maatha's family members came to know about the incident after some days and had an argument with her husband. In a fit of rage he told them not to argue with him and to go to her grave and cry. Her family members found white fresh flowers on her grave even after several days. They heard a celestial voice (Akashvani) directing them to get Sunama maatha's husband married to her sister Malkuma Jakini. Her family members refused and gossiped about this unnecessarily. Later they realised their mistake and agreed to the marriage. From that time onwards, Sunama Jakini Maatha is worshipped as goddess re-incarnation by the Are-Katika community.

Temple History 
The foundation stone for the temple was laid on 22-02-2002 and prana pratishtha was done on 14-02-2003.  On second annual celebration i.e., on 17-02-2005 and 18-02-2005 Shikhara was consecrated. From that year onwards annual celebrations (jaatara) is conducted on second Thursday and Friday of Maagha maasam of Indian Hindu calendar.

Devotees from Andhra Pradesh, Telangana, Karnataka, Tamilnadu, Pondicherry and Maharashtra states visit temple during annual celebrations (jaatara). The temple attracts approximately 15-20 thousand pilgrims during every annual jaatara.

Prana Pratishta of Sri Sunama Jakini and Malkuma Jakini moorthys was done from 11th to 14th Feb 2003.

Administration 
Temple committee manages the development activities of Sree Sunama Jakini Maata temple. It is operated by an elected body through elections among the are-katika community members.

Transport

Road

Gooty is connected by road to major cities as it is on National Highway 44 (formerly NH 7). State government owned Andhra Pradesh State Road Transport Corporation (APSRTC) operates buses from Gooty bus station to other parts of the state. Gooty is 313 km away from Hyderabad, 262 km from Bangalore and 69 km from Anantapur (officially: Anantapuramu).

Train

Gooty railway station is located on Guntakal–Chennai Egmore section of South Central Railways. Gooty is 325 km away from Hyderabad, 253 km from Bangalore and 57 km from Anantapur (officially: Anantapuramu).

Other Temples 
Other temples in and around Gooty

(Distance mentioned for the below temples is from Sri Sunama Jakini Matha temple)

Ankalamma Temple - It is 2.4 km away

Shirdi Sai Baba Temple - It is 2.5 km away

Pothuluri Veera Brahmendra Swamy Temple - It is 2.1 km away

Boli Konda Ranganatha Swamy - It is 2 km away

Krishna Temple - It is 2.1 km away

Sri Vasavi Kanyaka Parameswari Temple - It is 2.1 km away

Puligutta Bhaktha Anjaneya Swamy - It is 2.5 km away

Sri Harihara Putra Temple - It is approximately 2 km away

Kota Lakshmi Narasimha Swamy Temple - It is 3 km away

Sri Nettikanti Anjaneya SwamyTemple, Kasapuram, Guntakal - It is 31.1 km away

Gallery

References

 

 

 

 

<b>

Devi temples in Andhra Pradesh
Hindu temples in Anantapur district
Tourist attractions in Anantapur district